Hamudi may refer to:
 Hamudi, Dasht-e Azadegan
 Hamudi, Dezful
 Hamudi, Shush